The ANB-M is a Russian, single-seat, aluminum ultralight glider that was designed by Peter Almurzin (Петра Альмурзина), Nikitin, and Bogatov whose surnames make up the A,N,B in the glider name (Cyrillic:АНБ).

Design and development
The ANB-M first flew on 1 May 1983. The aircraft was designed as a primary glider of aluminum construction and its design team was headed by Peter Almurzin (Петра Альмурзина) in Kuibyshev (Куйбышева), Russia. Websites still sell plans for the ANB-M glider as a United States FAR 103 compliant ultralight glider which requires unpowered vehicles to weigh less than 155 lbs (70.3 kg).

Operational history
The ANB-M won first prize at the Soviet Ministry of Aviation Industry SLA-84 competition in 1984 at Koktebel

Variants
ANB-M
Initial version, first flown 1 May 1983, single seat primary glider with an 8.75 meter wingspan.
ANB-I
Developed as a double ANB-M model that was a two place glider that had the occupants separated in parallel by 2.2 meters apart and utilized an 11 meter wingspan with a twin boom tail.

Specifications

See also

References

1980s Russian sailplanes